The Family is Coming is a 2015 South Korean television series based on Kim Bum's 2012 novel Grandma's Back. Starring Lee Jung-hyun, Jin Yi-han, Oh Sang-jin and Park Won-sook, it aired on SBS from January 3 to March 15, 2015 on Saturdays and Sundays at 20:45 for 20 episodes.

Plot 
After 50 years living in Hollywood, Jung Kkeut-soon returns to Korea to reconnect with her family. As family members scramble to compete over her  inheritance, they learn emotional growth and reconciliation.

Cast

Main characters 
 Lee Jung-hyun as Na Joon-hee/Susan Johnson
 Jin Yi-han as Choi Dong-seok
 Oh Sang-jin as Jung Joon-ah/James
 Park Won-sook as Jung Kkeut-soon/Audrey Jung

Supporting characters 
 Jung Han-heon as Choi Jong-tae
 Park Jun-gyu as Choi Dal-soo
 Lee Hwi-hyang as Kim Jung-sook
 Baek Ji-won as Choi Dal-ja
 Ahn Hye-kyung as Choi Dong-eun
 Choi Jung-hoon as Kim Sang-woo / Han Sang-woo
 Hwang Chae-won as Park Chae-won
 Park So-jin as Choi Dong-joo
 Yoo Se-hyung as Yong Hong-gab	
 Cha Hak-yeon as Cha Hak-yeon
 Choi Jung-won as Han Sang-woo
 Han Min-chae as Lee Hyun-ae

Ratings 
In the table below, the blue numbers represent the lowest ratings and the red numbers represent the highest ratings.

International broadcast

References

External links 
  
 

2015 South Korean television series debuts
2015 South Korean television series endings
Seoul Broadcasting System television dramas
Korean-language television shows
Television shows based on South Korean novels
South Korean romantic comedy television series
Television series by AStory